The 2nd Nations Grand Prix was a Formula One motor race held on 2 May 1948 over 80 laps of a street circuit in Geneva, Switzerland. Giuseppe Farina, driving a Maserati 4CLT, started from pole, set fastest lap and won the race. Emmanuel de Graffenried was second in another 4CLT, and Raymond Sommer was third in a Ferrari 166 SC.

Classification

Qualifying

References

Nations Grand Prix
Nations Grand Prix